Victoria Jayne Lind (born  15 May 1985) is a New Zealand former cricketer who played as a wicket-keeper and right-handed batter. She appeared in 8 One Day Internationals and 2 Twenty20 Internationals for New Zealand in 2009 and 2010. She played domestic cricket for Auckland, as well as spending one season with Berkshire.

References

External links

1985 births
Living people
Cricketers from Auckland
New Zealand women cricketers
New Zealand women One Day International cricketers
New Zealand women Twenty20 International cricketers
Auckland Hearts cricketers
Berkshire women cricketers
New Zealand expatriate sportspeople in England